Jiaokou Station is an elevated terminus on Line 5 of the Guangzhou Metro. It is located at Fongcun Avenue West near the Jiaokou Coach Terminal in Fangcun, Liwan District, Guangzhou. and opened on 28December 2009.

Station layout

Exits

References

Railway stations in China opened in 2009
Guangzhou Metro stations in Liwan District